Marshall Mills was an American football player and coach.  He was the eighth head football coach at New York University (NYU) serving for one season, in 1905, leading the Violets to a record of 3–3–1.  Mills played college football as a guard at Princeton University in 1903.

Head coaching record

References

Year of birth missing
Year of death missing
American football guards
NYU Violets football coaches
Princeton Tigers football players